Elisabet "Betti" Alver ( in Jõgeva – 19 June 1989 in Tartu), was one of Estonia's most notable poets.  She was among the first generation to be educated in schools of an independent Estonia. She went to grammar school in Tartu.

Writing 
She began as a prose writer. She became known for being a member of the Arbujad ("Soothsayers"), a small group of influential Estonian poets including Bernard Kangro, Uku Masing, Kersti Merilaas, Mart Raud, August Sang, Heiti Talvik and Paul Viiding. After the war her husband Heiti Talvik was imprisoned by the Soviets and died in Siberia. For two or three decades she was silent as a poet as protest of Soviet rule, but renewed activity in the 1960s. Of note in this second period is the 1966 collection Tähetund or "Starry Hour." She also wrote novels and did translation work. On the hundredth anniversary of her birth a museum was dedicated to her in Jõgeva.

References

External links
 Betti Alver at Estonian Writers' Online Dictionary

1906 births
1989 deaths
People from Jõgeva
People from Kreis Dorpat
20th-century Estonian novelists
20th-century Estonian poets
Estonian women novelists
Estonian women poets
20th-century women writers
20th-century translators
People's Writers of the Estonian SSR
Burials at Raadi cemetery